Macdara Woods (1942 – 15 June 2018) was an Irish poet.

Biography
Woods was born in Dublin, where he attended Gonzaga College and then University College Dublin. He married the poet Eiléan Ní Chuilleanáin. They had one son, Niall, a musician. He lived in Dublin and Umbria. Woods was a founder-editor of the Irish literary magazine Cyphers. He died on 15 June 2018 in St. James's Hospital, aged 76.

Awards
He was elected a member of Aosdána (an organisation established by the Irish Government to honour those who have made an outstanding contribution to the Arts in Ireland) in 1986.

Publications
Poetry collections
Decimal D. Sec Drinks in a Bar in Marrakesh (1970), New Writers’ Press
Early Morning Matins (1973), Gallery Press
The King of the Dead & Other Libyan Tales (1978), Martin, Brian & O’Keeffe
Stopping the Lights in Ranelagh (1987, reprinted 1988), Dedalus Press
Miz Moon (1988), Dedalus Press
The Hanged Man Was Not Surrendering (1990), Dedalus Press
Notes From the Countries of Blood-Red Flowers (1994), Dedalus Press
Selected Poems (1996), Dedalus Press
Knowledge in the Blood, New and Selected Poems (2000, 2007), Dedalus Press
The Nightingale Water (2001), Dedalus Press
Artichoke Wine (2006), Dedalus Press
The Cotard Dimension (2011), Dedalus Press
Collected Poems (2012), Dedalus Press (in association with the Arts Council of Ireland)
From Sandymount To The Hill Of Howth (2014) Cyphers, Dublin.
Music From The Big Tent (2016) Dedalus Press

In Italian:
Biglietto di Sola Andata (1998) Moby Dick Editrice, Faenza
Above Pesaro/Con Pesaro ai Miei Piedi (1999) Volumnia Editrice, Perugia

Edited books
The Kilkenny Anthology (1991), Kilkenny Co. Council.
(with Jim Vaughan), Present Tense: Words and Pictures (2006), Mayo Co. Council

Woods's work has been translated into many languages. He has collaborated with musicians, notably Brendan Graham (Winter Fire & Snow, performed by Anúna and others), Benjamin Dwyer (In the Ranelagh Gardens), Militia (Above Pesaro/Con Pesaro ai Miei Piedi) and Richard Hartshorne (The Cello Suites).

References

External links
 Death notice
 Dedalus Press page
 Poetry International Rotterdam
 Aosdana

1942 births
2018 deaths
Aosdána members
Irish translators
Irish poets
People from County Dublin
20th-century translators